Exocarpos bidwillii is a small, sprawling, leafless shrub endemic to New Zealand and is a member of the family Santalaceae, all of which are root hemiparasites. It is found only in montane to subalpine open areas, mostly in rocky places of the South Island, from latitudes 41° to 45° 30' (corrected from H.H. Allens' mid-ocean figure of 48° 30'). 

The species name is after John Carne Bidwill.

Gallery

References

Santalaceae
Flora of New Zealand